Radek Záruba (born June 5, 1979 in Děčín) is a Czech sprint canoer who competed in the early 2000s. At the 2000 Summer Olympics in Sydney, he was eliminated in the semifinals of both the K-1 1000 m and the K-2 500 m events.

References
 Sports-Reference.com profile

1979 births
Canoeists at the 2000 Summer Olympics
Czech male canoeists
Living people
Olympic canoeists of the Czech Republic
People from Děčín
Sportspeople from the Ústí nad Labem Region